The 2017 Newfoundland and Labrador Men's Curling Championship (also known as the Tankard), the men's provincial curling championship for Newfoundland and Labrador, was held from January 26 to 29 at the Bally Haly Golf & Curling Club in St. John's, Newfoundland and Labrador. The winning team will represent Newfoundland and Labrador at the 2017 Tim Hortons Brier from the Mile One Centre in St. John's. This will be the second time the winner will be the hosting provincial team in the history of the Brier.

The event is being held in conjunction with the 2017 Newfoundland and Labrador Scotties Tournament of Hearts, the women's provincial championship, which will be held at the same time.

Teams
Teams are as follows:

Round robin standings

Round robin results

January 26
Draw 1
Thomas 5-8 Harvey
Gushue 7-2 Boland

Draw 2
Thomas 3-10 Boland  
Skanes 1-7 Gushue

January 27
Draw 3
Harvey 6-7 Boland
Skanes 8-10 Thomas

Draw 4
Skanes 4-6 Harvey 
Gushue 9-3 Thomas

January 28
Draw 5
Skanes 4-6 Boland 
Harvey 4-8 Gushue

Final
Gushue must be beaten twice

Saturday, January 28, 7:30pm NST

References

External links
Scores

2017 Tim Hortons Brier
Tankard, 2017
Tankard, 2017
Tankard, 2017
January 2017 sports events in Canada